Anna Marion Hilliard (June 17, 1902 – July 15, 1958) was a Canadian physician best known for her contribution to the development of a simplified Pap test.

Early life and education 
Hilliard was born in Morrisburg, Ontario, Canada, to Anna and Irwin Hilliard. As a child, Hilliard played the piano, and at one point, wanted to become a concert pianist. She also enjoyed playing sports, and was recognized as a top Intercollegiate ice hockey player with the University of Toronto Varsity Blues (1922 to 1927), and was officially inducted into their Hall of Fame in 1987.  To this day, the annual award for best women's hockey player in Canadian Inter-University Sports is named after Hilliard. She was also an active member of the Student Christian Movement, and served as President of the student chapter.

In 1920, Hilliard enrolled at the University of Toronto (Victoria College) and earned a Bachelor of Arts degree in 1924. She was awarded a Moss scholarship and continued her studies at the University of Toronto, pursuing a Bachelors of Medicine, which she earned in 1927.  She was a junior intern at Women's College Hospital in her last year of studies. Hilliard wanted to become an obstetrician and so needed to complete an internship in this field. Aware that it would be difficult to compete for internships with her male peers in Toronto, Hilliard decided to take a postgraduate course in obstetrics in London, England. She also believed this would bring her sufficient prestige when she returned home to build a successful practice. When she first arrived in London, HIlliard had to work as a part-time cook to support herself. She found a supervisor and mentor in Miss Gertrude Dearnley, a gynecological surgeon. She attended meetings in England and Switzerland for the Student Christian Movement before beginning a six month clinical assistantship in the Hospital for Women in Soho Square. She also took a series of surgical tutorials with the head of surgery at the Royal Free Hospital. Hilliard's studies included the handling of septic abortions and work on sterility. In October 1927, she passed her written and oral examinations, earning her degree of Licentiate from the Royal College of Physicians. In 1928, Hilliard became the third Canadian woman to be granted the degree of Member of the Royal College of Surgeons. She was able to stop her part-time work as a cook and move into residence at Queen Charlotte Hospital for a course in midwifery. She next moved to the Salvation Army Hospital, followed by the Rotunda Hospital in Dublin, completing her post-graduate studies before her twenty-sixth birthday.

Career 
Hilliard began her career in Canada by setting up a general practice in the Physicians and Surgeons Building in Toronto and joined the obstetrical staff at Women's College Hospital. Dr. Jane Sproule-Manson gave her office space amidst her practice on the fourth floor of the building. Hilliard was the first doctor assigned to the Children's Aid Society, on whose behalf she lectured to church and school groups on health subjects. She also later acted as medical examiner to the Young Women's Christian Association (YWCA). In 1929, she began to share both an office and flat with Dr. Eva Mader. Mader and Hilliard were sharing offices in the Physicians and Surgeons Building with two other physicians at the beginning of the 1930s. Out-patient clinics were established to help with relief recipients. Hilliard handled obstetrical cases, seeing as many as sixty patients in the afternoons when she worked at the clinic. She acted as staff representative to the hospital's Medical Advisory Board. In 1934, she went along with her Chief of Department, Dr. Marion Kerr, on a European study trip to Hungary and Austria. Hilliard followed courses and observed at Budapest's Polyklinic. Hilliard and Kerr also visited hospitals in Vienna and the Royal Free Hospital in London, before attending the annual meeting of the British Medical Association in Bournemouth.

In 1947, Hilliard herself was appointed chief of the department until she retired in 1957.  Also in 1947, she collaborated with Dr. Eva (Mader) Macdonald, then Director of the Women's College Hospital laboratories, and Dr. W.L. Robison, to develop a simplified Pap test. As an obstetrician, Hilliard was known for having delivered as many as fifty babies in a single month. She served as President of the Federation of Medical Women of Canada from 1955 to 1956. Her series of articles written for Chatelaine were published as the 1957 book A Woman Doctor Looks at Love and Life.  That same year, she attended the United Nations Commission on the Status of Women as the Canadian representative of the YWCA.  Her illness, diagnosed later in 1957, stopped her from being installed as President-elect of the International Medical Women's Association.

Death 
Hilliard died on July 15, 1958, in Toronto. When a new residence at Glendon College, York University was built in 1966, it was named in her honour.

Works 

 
  Published post-humously.

References 

1902 births
1958 deaths
20th-century Canadian women scientists
Canadian women's ice hockey players
University of Toronto alumni
Fellows of the Royal College of Physicians
Canadian women physicians
Canadian obstetricians
People from the United Counties of Stormont, Dundas and Glengarry
20th-century women physicians
20th-century Canadian physicians